Events from the year 1723 in France

Incumbents
 Monarch – Louis XV
Regent: Philippe II, Duke of Orléans (until 15 February)

Events
15 February – King Louis XV attains his majority on his 13th birthday, bringing an end to the 7½-year Régence of his cousin Philippe II, Duke of Orléans.
22 March – 4 Protestant preachers are hanged at Montpellier.
10 August – Philippe II, Duke of Orléans, previously regent, is appointed by the King to serve as his chief minister, but dies in office less than four months later.

Births

5 January – Nicole-Reine Lepaute, astronomer and mathematician (died 1788)
21 February – Louis-Pierre Anquetil, historian (died 1808)
30 April – Mathurin Jacques Brisson, zoologist (died 1806)
11 July – Jean-François Marmontel, historian, writer (died 1799)

Deaths
13 March – René Auguste Constantin de Renneville, Protestant poet and historian (born 1650)
11 May – Jean Galbert de Campistron, dramatist (born 1656)
29 May – Jean de La Chapelle, novelist and playwright (born 1621)
10 August – Guillaume Dubois, cardinal and statesman (born 1656)
20 September – Félix Le Pelletier de La Houssaye, statesman (born 1663)
2 December – Philippe II, Duke of Orléans, chief minister, ex-regent (born 1674)
Full date missing – Charles d'Agar, painter (born 1669)

See also

References

1720s in France